Gardominka is a river of Poland, a tributary of the Rega near Baszewice.

Rivers of Poland
Rivers of West Pomeranian Voivodeship